Webster is a village in Monroe County, New York. The population was 5,399 at the time of the 2010 census. The village and town are named after orator and statesman Daniel Webster.

The Village of Webster lies near the center of the Town of Webster. It was incorporated in 1905. The village is crossed by Routes 104, 250, and 404.

Geography
Webster is located at  (43.212113, -77.427292).

According to the United States Census Bureau, the village has a total area of 2.2 square miles (5.7 km2), all land.

History
The village of Webster has historically served as the core of the town of Webster. The commercial section of the village dates back to 1812, when the first two buildings were constructed near the present four corners. One of these buildings was a store and the other a tavern. From this modest beginning, the community and its center began to grow, becoming the commercial, social, and educational center of the town.1

The history of the village center reflects the changing economy of the community. The village core was originally an agricultural center and distribution point for the town. The junction of Ridge Road and Webster Nine-Mile Point Road, which connected shipping points on the Erie Canal and the New York Central Railroad with a small port on Lake Ontario, was referred to as "the Village" because of a concentration of population and businesses. The railroad at the north end of the village attracted dried or evaporated apple businesses and small wood-working industries. The Village continued to be the shipping center for the area's dried apple industry until well after World War I. The village also had the world's largest basket factory and was the center for the canning industry in Monroe County.2

At the beginning of the 1900s, several events significantly influenced the development of the village and its downtown core. The first bank since the Civil War era was established in the core area and the Rochester-Sodus Bay Trolley connected Webster to Rochester leading to a major expansion of the village residential area. In 1905, the village was incorporated followed by municipal infrastructure improvements and services including fire protection, water service and sewage disposal.3
As the primary commercial hub of the area, the village of Webster also became the focus of the community's social life. The presence of the post office, library, banks, and government offices all served to bring people into the area. Further, commercial buildings also had several functions providing retail space on the ground floor and offices or residential apartments on the upper floors. These tenants provided sufficient rental income for property owners to both make a profit and properly maintain their buildings.4

After World War II, there were striking changes that transformed Webster's character. First, the agricultural nature of the area has been seen major encroachment by suburban growth moving outward from Rochester. The Town of Webster became one of the major suburban residential areas in Monroe County with its population more than doubling between 1950 and 1960. Substantial residential development has continued to the present. As a consequence, the agricultural industry that made the Village center a market point, administrative, social, and institutional center has diminished. Secondly. decisions made in the 1950s and 1960s by the former Haloid Company, now Xerox, to invest in major office, research and manufacturing facilities to be located in the village and the town of Webster brought about extensive changes in population growth trends in the area. The construction of Route 104 also contributed greatly to the area's growth as access to the metropolitan area was vastly improved. Along with population growth, there has been significant commercial expansion in the village.

The Jayne and Mason Bank Building, William C. Jayne House, George G. Mason House, and Webster Baptist Church are listed on the National Register of Historic Places.

Footnotes
1 Webster ... Through The Years, Esther Dunn
2 Village of Webster Comprehensive Plan, 1998
3 Arthur Reed, Materials prepared for development study, 1965
4 National Trust for Historic Preservation, “What Happened to America’s Main Streets?”

Demographics

As of the census of 2000, there were 5,216 people, 2,231 households, and 1,345 families residing in the village. The population density was 2,376.2 people per square mile (915.4/km2). There were 2,304 housing units at an average density of 1,049.6 per square mile (404.4/km2). The racial makeup of the village was 89.07% White, 4.10% Black or African American, 0.31% Native American, 3.66% Asian, 0.81% from other races, and 2.05% from two or more races. Hispanic or Latino of any race were 2.09% of the population.

There were 2,231 households, out of which 32.1% had children under the age of 18 living with them, 42.3% were married couples living together, 14.8% had a female householder with no husband present, and 39.7% were non-families. 34.2% of all households were made up of individuals, and 10.8% had someone living alone who was 65 years of age or older. The average household size was 2.30 and the average family size was 2.98.

In the village, the population was spread out, with 26.3% under the age of 18, 7.3% from 18 to 24, 32.6% from 25 to 44, 19.8% from 45 to 64, and 14.1% who were 65 years of age or older. The median age was 35 years. For every 100 females, there were 88.4 males. For every 100 females age 18 and over, there were 83.5 males.

The median income for a household in the village was $38,651, and the median income for a family was $49,471. Males had a median income of $39,613 versus $25,446 for females. The per capita income for the village was $21,317. About 8.3% of families and 11.9% of the population were below the poverty line, including 12.5% of those under age 18 and 6.5% of those age 65 or over.

Parks

These include the Schantz Village Manor Park, the Milton R Case Memorial Park, the Wilmorite Playground, the Veterans Memorial Park located on North Avenue and Harmony Park located on the corner of Foster Drive and Phillips Road. The Veterans Memorial Park contains a Large Gazebo which is the scene of the 9/11 Commemoration, the Veteran's Day Service, the Summer Friday night concert series and summer Movies in the Park. The Village Days Festival takes place each year in August along Main Street and in the Veterans Memorial Park. The Village of Webster also maintains the Village Band shell at Harmony Park on Foster Drive off Phillips Road. The band plays concerts in the band-shell on most Thursday evenings throughout the summer.

The Town of Webster's North Ponds Park is located just north of the Village boundary, and has facilities for hiking, picnicking, and fishing. A paved bike path, located adjacent to the expressway is easily accessible to Village residents. The Town of Webster Parks and Recreation center is located adjacent to the Village on Chiyoda Drive. This department offers recreational activities as well as hot meals during the week, for both Town and Village senior citizens.

Government

The village is governed by Mayor Darrell Byerts and four trustees. The Village Board meets on the second and fourth Thursdays of each month at 7:00 PM. The Village of Webster has a Planning Board and Zoning Board, which normally meet on the first and third Thursdays of the month, respectively. The Village Board has established numerous residents' committees including a Historic Preservation Committee, a Parks and Recreation Committee, a Senior and Disabled Committee, and a Water Committee. The Village maintains a comprehensive calendar on the Village of Webster Website. Two members of the Village Board, the Mayor and a Trustee, are members of the Business Improvement District (BID) Board of Directors and the Farmers Market Committee. The mayor is a member of the Webster Community Coalition for Economic Development (WCCED) Board of Directors and regularly attends meetings of the Webster Chamber of Commerce.

Services

Water is provided by the Monroe County Water Authority. The Village Public Works Department plows the streets and sidewalks during the winter and maintains the roads and parks during the summer. Also once a month tree limbs are picked up year around, and in the fall leaves are picked up and composted by the Village. The Town of Webster Police Department protects citizens around the clock. Emergency services are provided by the Northeast Joint Fire District and Union Hill Ambulance. The Webster Village is also home to the Webster Post Office serving people who live and work in the Town and Village of Webster as well as people in the surrounding community. There is an excellent museum in the Village that illustrates the history of the Village and Town of Webster as well as the people of the early 1900s.

References

External links

Village of Webster, NY
Village of Webster Businesses
RW&O Railroad Station, Webster, NY

Villages in New York (state)
Rochester metropolitan area, New York
1905 establishments in New York (state)
Villages in Monroe County, New York
Populated places established in 1905